Mendi-Munihu District is a district of the Southern Highlands Province of Papua New Guinea.  Its capital is Mendi.  The population was 144,629 at the 2011 census.

Settlements 

 Kamb
 Kip
 Mendi
 Munhiu
 Pingirip
 Shumbi

References

Districts of Papua New Guinea
Southern Highlands Province